Lake Heihai is a small mesosaline lake in Golmud County, Haixi Prefecture, Qinghai Province, in western China.

Names
"Lake Heihai" is an English clarification of the pinyin romanization of the Chinese name  meaning . (As with Qinghai Lake, the Chinese word for "sea" is sometimes used to translate the Mongolian naɣur, which was once used ambiguously for all large bodies of water.)

Geography

Meltwater flows from two small glaciated areas in the Kunluns. The outflow to the east is the source of the Kunlun River, the upper stretch of the Golmud River.

Polygonum sibiricum occupies moist saline sites close to the lake; drier land further from shore is characterized by Kobresia robusta on the sandier north side and Poa pachyantha on the south side.

History
During the Pleistocene, sediment from glaciers in the Kunlun temporarily blocked outflow of the valley's main meltwater stream, forming the present lake. Particularly strong winds weathered and shaped the surrounding rocks from 10080,000 years ago. At times, probably around 50 kya, 13 kya, and 11.6 kya,  Lake Heihai overflowed the present  elevation difference to join with the smaller lake to its west, increasing its catchment by another  and leaving lacustrine sediments across  of now-dry land. During the mid-Holocene, from around 84,000 years ago, the climate was wetter and warmer, possibly from increased influence from the Indian or East Asian monsoon. By the late Holocene, the monsoon was no longer able to reach the lake and its environment became drier and windier again.

Culture
As the largest present lake in the Kunlun Mountains, it has become identified with the "Jade Pond" (also translated as the "Nacre" or "Turquoise Pond" and "Lake of Gems") important in various myths involving the Queen Mother of the West. Lake Heihai has a stone temple to the Queen Mother and a large slab reading "Xiwangmu Yaochi".

See also
 List of lakes in China

References

Citations

Bibliography

 .
 .
 .
 .
 .
 .

External links
 A map of the Heihai's catchment

Heihai